Lake Byllesby is a 1,432-acre (580 ha) artificial lake on the Cannon River in Dakota and Goodhue counties, in the U.S. State of Minnesota. The lake was formed as a result of construction of the Byllesby Dam by the H.M. Byllesby & Company, which would later become Northern States Power Company for hydroelectric power generation.

The Lake Byllesby Regional Park, operated by Dakota County Parks & Trails Department offers several boat launch facilities, RV and tent campground, hiking/biking trails, picnic areas, and a swimming beach on the northeast part of the lake. Goodhue County also operates a small park on the southeast part of the lake with picnic areas and a boat launch.

The lake area is designated as an Important Bird Area by the National Audubon Society for its importance for bird habitat in the Cannon River Valley.

Fishing 
According to the Minnesota Department of Natural Resources (MN DNR), the lake is home to the following fish species: black bullhead, black crappie, bluegill, channel catfish, crappie, green sunfish, hybrid sunfish, largemouth bass, northern pike, pumpkinseed, smallmouth bass, walleye, white bass, white crappie, yellow bullhead, yellow perch, bigmouth buffalo, bowfin (dogfish), carpsucker, common carp, freshwater drum, golden redhorse, greater redhorse, quillback, shorthead redhorse, silver redhorse, white sucker, bluntnose minnow, emerald shiner, and golden shiner.

Invasive species 
According to the Minnesota Department of Natural Resources, Flowering rush is prevalent in the lake and is considered an invasive species. It is illegal under Minnesota State Law to transport this species away from the lake.

See also
List of lakes in Minnesota
Byllesby Dam
List of dams and reservoirs in Minnesota
Hydroelectric power in the United States 
List of dams and reservoirs in United States

References

External links
Minnesota Department of Natural Resources (MN DNR) - Lake Byllesby Information
Lake Byllesby Improvement Association
Lake Byllesby Regional Park - Dakota County
Byllesby Park - Goodhue County

Byllesby
Bodies of water of Dakota County, Minnesota
Bodies of water of Goodhue County, Minnesota
Tourist attractions in Dakota County, Minnesota
Tourist attractions in Goodhue County, Minnesota